His Wife's Mother is a 1909 American silent short comedy film directed by D. W. Griffith.

Cast
 John R. Cumpson as Mr. Eddie Jones
 Florence Lawrence as Mrs. Emma Jones
 Dorothy West as maid
 Anita Hendrie as Mrs. Jones' mother
 Linda Arvidson as restaurant diner
 Flora Finch in unconfirmed role
 Robert Harron as busboy
 Charles Inslee as waiter
 Arthur V. Johnson as restaurant diner
 David Miles at confectionery 
 Owen Moore as restaurant diner
 Mack Sennett as waiter

References

External links
 

1909 films
1909 comedy films
1909 short films
Silent American comedy films
American silent short films
American black-and-white films
Films directed by D. W. Griffith
American comedy short films
1900s American films